The Xingtai XTQ1020 was a 2-tonne pickup truck produced by Xingtai 114 Automobile Factory. It had a four-door body, long before Dacia produced such a variant.

Overview
Xingtai 114 Automobile Factory assembled the Dacia pickup in the 1980s and 1990s, according to a Chinese-language overview of the company's history.

They also manufactured a station wagon version, based on the Dacia 1310, with reports of a sedan variant and the Dacia 1309 being offered.

Other versions
The Shenyang Sanshan Company produced their own version of the Xingtai XTQ1020, which had the same design.

Media
The Xingtai XTQ1020 was featured in the 1993 Chinese film Dai qiang de ge nu.

References

Cars of China
1980s cars
1990s cars
Pickup trucks